Alma is a small town situated south of Vaalwater in the Limpopo province of South Africa. The area is surrounded by green-gray bushveld vegetation and a few private game reserves are located in the malaria free area. 

The Mokolo River originates near Alma at the confluence of the Sand River with the Grootspruit River in a flattish, open area with numerous koppies, before it flows through a steep gorge emerging above the town of Vaalwater.

Nearby towns
 Warmbaths (now known as Bela Bela)
 Lephalale/Ellisras
 Modimolle/Nylstroom
 Naboomspruit
 Thabazimbi
 Vaalwater

References

Populated places in the Modimolle–Mookgophong Local Municipality